Venus Williams was the defending champion, but she chose not to participate despite having qualified for this year's edition.

Petra Kvitová won the title, defeating Elina Svitolina in the final, 6–4, 6–2. Kvitová did not drop a set throughout the entire tournament.

Like Williams the year before, Kvitová has now won both the WTA Finals, in 2011, and WTA Elite Trophy, also becoming the first player to win both tournaments on her debut appearance.

Players

Alternate

Draw

Finals

Azalea group

Camellia group

Peony group

Rose group

References

External links
Official Website
 Order of Play
 Single Draw

WTA Elite Trophy
WTA Elite Trophy
2016 in Chinese tennis